Harold Clayton Luther (October 5, 1915 – May 15, 1973) was an American politician from New York.

Life
He was born on October 5, 1915, in Salisbury Center, Herkimer County, New York, the son of Clayton Luther (1882–1950) and Clara (Johnson) Luther (1885–1976). He attended Mohawk Valley Community College and the University of Richmond. Then he engaged in the insurance business in Dolgeville. On September 4, 1948, he married Muriel J. Jones (1922–2010), and they had two children.

Luther entered politics as a Republican, and was Supervisor of the Town of Manheim.

He was a member of the New York State Assembly (113th D.) in 1973. He died near the end of the regular legislative session, on May 15, 1973, in Albany Medical Center in Albany, New York, after a heart attack; and was buried at the Salisbury Rural Cemetery.

References

External links
 

1915 births
1973 deaths
People from Salisbury, Herkimer County, New York
Republican Party members of the New York State Assembly
University of Richmond alumni
Town supervisors in New York (state)
20th-century American politicians